Simon Spender (born 15 November 1985) is a Welsh football coach and former professional footballer who is currently an academy coach at The New Saints.

Career
Born in Mold, Flintshire, Spender came up through the youth system at Wrexham and made his debut in a 0–0 draw with Plymouth Argyle in March 2004. He made six appearances in the 2003–04 season, impressing in a 2–1 win over Luton Town. He made 19 appearances in the 2004–05 season and was rewarded with his first professional contract in May 2005. Spender made a further 21 appearances in the 2005–06 season and was given a new contract in summer of 2006. He established himself as the first-choice right-back and by the end of the 2007–08 season had made over 100 appearances for Wrexham. Spender missed three months of the 2008–09 season with a broken elbow and in March 2009, joined Barrow on loan for the remainder of the season, helping them to avoid relegation. He was not offered a contract by Wrexham at the end of the season, and signed a permanent two-year contract with Barrow.

Spender spent two seasons with Barrow. In his first year at the club he won the FA Trophy and made the most appearances for the club of any player that season. The following year Spender remained a regular and helped Barrow avoid relegation yet again. In May 2011 he was offered a new contract by Barrow, but chose to take up the option of professional football at The New Saints in the Welsh Premier League. His competitive debut for the club took place on 30 June 2011 against Cliftonville in a Europa League first qualifying round match.

Spender retired in June 2021 and moved into a coaching role at The New Saints.

Honours
The New Saints
Welsh Premier League: 2011–12, 2012–13, 2013–14, 2014–15, 2015–16, 2016–17
Welsh Cup: 2011–12, 2013–14, 2014–15, 2015–16
Welsh League Cup: 2014–15, 2015–16, 2016–17, 2017–18

Barrow

 FA Trophy: 2009-10

Individual
 Welsh Premier League Team of the Year: 2014–15, 2015–16, 2016–17

References

External links

Simon Spender Profile at BarrowAFC.com

1985 births
Living people
Sportspeople from Mold, Flintshire
Footballers from Wrexham
Welsh footballers
Wales under-21 international footballers
Association football defenders
Wrexham A.F.C. players
Barrow A.F.C. players
English Football League players
National League (English football) players
The New Saints F.C. players
The New Saints F.C. non-playing staff